This is a list of fossiliferous stratigraphic units in Angola.



List of fossiliferous stratigraphic units 

Itombe formation was considered Turonian in age, but new data suggests to be Coniacian.

See also 
 Lists of fossiliferous stratigraphic units in Africa
 List of fossiliferous stratigraphic units in the Democratic Republic of the Congo
 List of fossiliferous stratigraphic units in Namibia
 List of fossiliferous stratigraphic units in Zambia
 List of fossiliferous stratigraphic units in Zimbabwe
 Geology of Angola

References

Further reading 
 M. T. Antunes, J. G. Maisey, M. M. Marques, B. Schaeffer, and K. S. Thomson. 1990. Triassic Fishes from the Cassange Depression (R. P. De Angola). Ciências da Terra (UNL), Número Especial 1-64
 M. T. Antunes. 1977. Late Neogene fish faunas from Angola, their age and significance. Journal of the Paleontological Society of India 20:224-229
 D. B. Blake, G. Breton, and S. Gofas. 1996. A new genus ans [sic] species of Asteriidae (Asteroidea; Echinodermata) from the Upper Cretaceous (Coniacian) of Angola, Africa. Paläontologische Zeitschrift 70(1/2):181-187
 K. E. Caster. 1938. Macroscopic fauna of the Quimbriz (Eocene) Formation on the Lucolo River, Angola. Separata do tômo XX das Communições dos Serviços Geológicos de Portugal
 J. Graf, L. Jacobs, M. Polcyn, O. Mateus, and A. Schulp. 2011. New fossil whales from Angola. Journal of Vertebrate Paleontology Abstracts:119
 A. K. Miller. 1951. Tertiary nautiloids of west-coastal Africa. Annales du Museé du Congo Belge Tervuren, Sciences Géologiques 8:1-88
 R. C. Wood. 1973. Fossil marine turtle remains from the Paleocene of the Congo. Annales du Musee Royal d'Afrique Centrale, Sciences Geologiques 75:1-28

Angola
 
 
Angola geography-related lists
Fossil